Pavel Lazarev (March 31, 1970 – September 03, 2018) was a Soviet and a Russian former professional ice hockey forward, who played for the Russia in (Izvestia Trophy 1994). He is a two-time Russian Champion

Career statistics

Awards and honours

References

External links
Biographical information and career statistics from Eliteprospects.com, or The Internet Hockey Database

1970 births
2018 deaths
Chelmet Chelyabinsk players
Traktor Chelyabinsk players
Ak Bars Kazan players
HC Lada Togliatti players
Rødovre Mighty Bulls players
Energia Kemerovo players
Sputnik Nizhny Tagil players
Zauralie Kurgan players
Russian ice hockey forwards
Sportspeople from Chelyabinsk